Silverton High School may refer to one of these U.S. high schools:

Silverton High School (Oregon), Silverton, Oregon
Silverton High School (Texas), Silverton, Texas